Cheraghabad may refer to:
Cheraghabad, Hormozgan
Cheraghabad-e Bala, Hormozgan Province
Cheraghabad-e Jonubi, Hormozgan Province
Cheraghabad-e Markazi, Hormozgan Province
Cheraghabad, Kerman
Cheraghabad, Manujan, Kerman Province
Cheraghabad, Rudbar-e Jonubi, Kerman Province
Cheraghabad-e Chah Log, Kerman Province
Cheraghabad, Kermanshah
Cheraghabad, Firuzabad, Kermanshah County, Kermanshah Province
Cheraghabad, Sahneh, Kermanshah Province
Cheraghabad, Kurdistan
Cheraghabad, Qorveh, Kurdistan Province
Cheraghabad, Lorestan
Charaghabad Pir Dusti, Lorestan Province, Iran
Cheraghabad, Sistan and Baluchestan
Cheraghabad Cham Nus, Lorestan Province, Iran
Cheraghabad-e Olya, Lorestan Province, Iran
Cheraghabad-e Sofla, Lorestan Province, Iran
Cheraghabad Rural District, in Hormozgan Province, Iran